Beinn Fhionnlaidh is a mountain in the West Highlands of Scotland. It is situated between Glen Etive and Glen Creran, to the south of Glen Coe.

References

Munros
Mountains and hills of Argyll and Bute
Marilyns of Scotland